Ingalill Olsen (born 15 December 1955) is a Norwegian politician for the Norwegian Labour Party (Arbeiderpartiet). She served as mayor of the municipality Måsøy from 1995 to 2009.

Olsen was elected to the Norwegian Parliament from Finnmark in 2009.

References

1955 births
Living people
Members of the Storting
Finnmark politicians
Labour Party (Norway) politicians
21st-century Norwegian politicians